Joseph Margulies is an American attorney with the MacArthur Justice Center and a professor of law and government at Cornell University in Ithaca, New York.

Education 
Margulies earned a Bachelor of Arts degree from Cornell University and a Juris Doctor from the Northwestern University School of Law.

Career 
Margulies was lead counsel in Rasul v. Bush, the case in which the Supreme Court of the United States established prisoners at Guantanamo Bay detention camp are entitled to judicial review and the U.S. court system has the authority to decide whether non-U.S. citizens held in Guantanamo Bay were wrongfully imprisoned.

Margulies is the author of the book Guantánamo and the Abuse of Presidential Power and of What Changed When Everything Changed: 9/11 and the Making of National Identity

Publications
 Margulies, Joseph. "The Promise of May, the Betrayal of June, and the Larger Lesson of Manning and Snowden." (Archive) Verdict. Justia. July 17, 2013.

References

Guantanamo Bay attorneys
Cornell University alumni
Living people
Northwestern University Pritzker School of Law alumni
Year of birth missing (living people)